The King of Mann was the title taken between 1237 and 1504 by the various rulers, both sovereign and suzerain, over the Kingdom of Mann – the Isle of Man which is located in the Irish Sea, at the centre of the British Isles.  Since 1504, the head of state has been known as the Lord of Mann.

Celtic Kings of Ynys Manaw (before 836)

Tutagual Theodovellaunus (c. 485–c. 495); son of Cinuit, also king of Alt Clut and Galwyddel
Dingat (c. 495); son of Tutagual, also king of Galwyddel
 (c. 550); son of Dingat, exiled king of Galwyddel
 (c. 575), son of Sennylt Hael
Diwg (c. 600s), client king of Áedán mac Gabráin of Dál Riata
Edwin of Northumbria (620–633), also king of Bernicia and Deira
 (until c. 682), descendant of Magnus Maximus
 (from c. 682), son of Merfyn Fawr
 (c. 710), son of Anarawd
Sandde (c. 730), descendant of Llywarch Hen of Rheged, husband of Celemion daughter of Tudwal
Elidyr (c. 790), son of Sandde
Gwriad (until 825), son of Elidyr, married Esyllt daughter of Cynan of Gwynedd
Merfyn Frych (825–836), son of Gwriad, later king of Gwynedd

Kingdom of Mann and the Isles (836–1237)

See Kingdom of the Isles and List of rulers of the Kingdom of the Isles
Since the emergence of Somerled and his descendants in the 12th century, the Manx kings began to lose territory and power in the Hebrides. Before the reigns of the three sons of Olaf the Black, the Manx kings styled themselves "King of the Isles". By the time of the reigns of Olaf's sons, the kings had begun to style themselves "King of Mann and the Isles".

Suzerainty of Norway (1237–1265)
The Kings of Mann and the Isles were vassals of the Kings of Norway.
Harald Olafsson (1237–1248)
Ragnald Olafsson (1249)
Harald Godredson (1249–1252)
Magnus Olafsson (1252–1265)

Scottish and English rule (1265–1333)

Between 1265 and 1333, Mann was ruled directly by the kings of Scotland (1265–1290, 1293–1296, 1313–1317, 1328–1333) or the kings of England (1290–1293, 1296–1313, 1317–1328).

Independent kingdom (1333–1399)
 
On 9 August 1333 Edward III renounced all royal claims over the Isle of Man, and recognised it as an independent kingdom under its then king, William Montacute, 1st Earl of Salisbury.

William le Scrope, Earl of Wiltshire was the last King of Mann in this line, claiming descent from the House of Godred Crovan, the earlier Norse Rulers.

William le Scrope was executed for treason for his support of Richard II in his struggle with Henry Bolingbroke, who defeated Richard and became Henry IV. Le Scrope's possessions, including the Isle of Man, passed to the Crown.

Kings of Mann in this period
William Montagu, 1st Earl of Salisbury (1333–1344)
William Montagu, 2nd Earl of Salisbury (1344–1392)
William Scrope, 1st Earl of Wiltshire (1392–1399)

English suzerainty (1399–1504)
As Henry's predecessor, Edward III, had recognised Mann as an independent kingdom, Henry IV did not directly claim the Manx throne, but instead proclaimed that he had acquired the island by right of conquest, which in international legal theory at that time erased any existing constitutional arrangements. He then on 19 October 1399 granted the Island, as a fiefdom under the English Crown, to Henry Percy, 1st Earl of Northumberland together with wide-ranging powers of government and associated regalities, together with the style of 'Lord of Man', in a position of feudality and thus without sovereignty. Despite this, Percy styled himself as 'King of Mann'.

Following Percy's treasonous rebellion, Henry IV granted the suzerainty of the Isle of Man, on similar terms but only for the term of his life, to Sir John Stanley in 1405. In addition, but separate from the power of governance over the Island, John Stanley was also granted the patronage of the Diocese of Sodor and Man.

A second letters-patent were issued and re-granted to Sir John Stanley on 6 April 1406, the difference being that the grant was inheritable and had a different feudal fee, the service of which comprised rendering homage and a tribute of two falcons to all future kings of England on their coronations.

Kings of Mann in this period
Henry, Earl of Northumberland (1399–1405)
John Stanley (1405–1414)
John Stanley (1414–1437)
Thomas, Lord Stanley (1437–1459)
Thomas, Earl of Derby (1459–1504)

Lord of Mann (1504–present)

Edward Stanley, 3rd Earl of Derby, the son of Thomas Stanley, 2nd Earl of Derby, did not take the style "King", and he and his successors were generally known instead as Lord of Mann. However, the Latin style Rex Manniae et Insularum (King of Mann and the Isles) continued to be occasionally used in official documents until at least the 17th century.

In 1765 the title was revested in the Crown of Great Britain; thus today the title, Lord of Mann, is used by King Charles III.

Claims to the throne
In 2007, an American businessman named David Drew Howe, after researching his genealogy, claimed to be rightful "King of Man". His attempts to claim the defunct title and gain the acceptance of his "subjects" are the focus of the 2015 TLC docudrama series Suddenly Royal''. In 2017, Howe "abdicated the throne" and abandoned any claims to the title of 'King of Man'.

See also
 History of the Isle of Man
 Noble and royal titles of the Isle of Man

References

Man
Isle of Man-related lists
 King
Medieval England
Noble titles of the Isle of Man